Minase Dam is a rockfill dam located in Akita Prefecture in Japan. The dam is used for flood control, irrigation and power production. The catchment area of the dam is 172 km2. The dam impounds about 150  ha of land when full and can store 31600 thousand cubic meters of water. The construction of the dam was started on 1957 and completed in 1963.

References

Dams in Akita Prefecture
1963 establishments in Japan